Venia was an American Christian hardcore band from Minneapolis, Minnesota. The band started making music in 2006 and disbanded in 2012. The band released two studio albums, Convictions in 2008, and Frozen Hands, in 2009, with Blood and Ink Records. Their subsequent release was an extended play, I've Lost All Faith in Myself.

Background
Venia was a Christian hardcore band from Minneapolis, Minnesota, where they were a musical entity from 2006 until their disbandment in 2012. The last known line-up for the band, was vocalist, Chad Urich, guitarists, Ben Kocinski and John McCully, Jr., bassist, Chanse Goetz, and drummer, Matt Bakken, while their former members before this were guitarist, Ben Beecken, and bassist, Matt Norris.

Music history
The band commenced as a musical entity in 2006 with their first release, Frozen Hands, a studio album, that was released on July 14, 2009, from Blood and Ink Records. Their subsequent release, an extended play, was released on November 29, 2010, by Blood and Ink Records.<ref name="HM Magazine Review">{{cite web |p=36 |first=Daniel |last=Garcia |title=Venia - I've Lost All Faith in Myself |url=http://issuu.com/hmmagazine/docs/jan-feb-2011 |journal=HM Magazine|accessdate=July 23, 2015 |issue=Jan/Feb 2011}}</ref>

Members
Last known line-up
 Chad Urich – vocals
 Ben Kocinski - guitar (formerly of Torn)
 John McCully, Jr.- guitar
 Chanse Goetz- Bass
 Matt Bakken - drums 
Former members
 Ben Beecken - guitar  
 Matt Norris - bass
 Mat Roberts - bass/vocals/keyboard

Discography
Studio albums
 Convictions (2008)
 Frozen Hands (July 17, 2009, Blood and Ink)

EPs
 I've Lost All Faith in Myself'' (November 29, 2010, Blood and Ink)

References

External links
 Facebook profile
 Blood and Ink Records

Musical groups from Minnesota
2006 establishments in Minnesota
2012 disestablishments in Minnesota
Musical groups established in 2006
Musical groups disestablished in 2012
Blood and Ink Records artists